Chiromyza is a genus of flies in the family Stratiomyidae.

Species
Chiromyza australis (Macquart, 1850)
Chiromyza ava (Enderlein, 1921)
Chiromyza brevicornis (Lindner, 1949)
Chiromyza enderleini (Lindner, 1949)
Chiromyza fulva Nagatomi & Yukawa, 1969
Chiromyza gressitti Nagatomi & Yukawa, 1969
Chiromyza leptiformis (Macquart, 1838)
Chiromyza matruelis (Enderlein, 1921)
Chiromyza nigra Bezzi, 1922
Chiromyza ochracea Wiedemann, 1820
Chiromyza papuae Nagatomi & Yukawa, 1969
Chiromyza prisca Walker, 1852
Chiromyza raccai Pujol-Luz, 2020
Chiromyza sedlaceki Nagatomi & Yukawa, 1969
Chiromyza stemmaticalis (Enderlein, 1921)
Chiromyza stylicornis (Enderlein, 1921)
Chiromyza tenuicornis (Lindner, 1949)
Chiromyza tristrigata (Enderlein, 1921)
Chiromyza vicina Bigot, 1879
Chiromyza vittata Wiedemann, 1820

References

Stratiomyidae
Brachycera genera
Taxa named by Christian Rudolph Wilhelm Wiedemann
Diptera of Africa
Diptera of Asia
Diptera of Australasia
Diptera of South America